Gnama Akaté (born 25 November 1991) is a Togolese professional footballer who plays as a midfielder for ASKO Kara and the Togo national team.

Club career
Akaté began his senior career in his native Togo, beginning his career at Masséda, followe by a stint at Douanges. He moved to Benin with Tonnerre d'Abomey, and then Qatar with El Jaish in 2011. He returned to Togo with Dynamic Togolais and Agaza, before moving to the Lebanese club Al Nabi Chit in 2016. He returned to Togo with Togo-Port, then Maldives with United Victory, before finally returning to Togo with ASKO Kara where he helped the club win the 2021 Togolese Championnat National.

International career
Akaté made his debut with the Togo national team in a 2–0 2016 African Nations Championship qualification loss to Niger on 17 October 2015. He captained the Togo squad that helped qualified into the 2020 African Nations Championship.

Honour
ASKO Kara
 Togolese Championnat National: 2021

References

External links
 
 
 FDB Profile

1991 births
Living people
People from Kara Region
Togolese footballers
Togo international footballers
Association football midfielders
Benin Premier League players
Qatar Stars League players
Lebanese Premier League players
Dhivehi Premier League players
El Jaish SC players
Al Nabi Chit SC players
Togolese expatriate footballers
Togolese expatriate sportspeople in Benin
Expatriate footballers in Benin
Togolese expatriate sportspeople in Qatar
Expatriate footballers in Qatar
Togolese expatriate sportspeople in Lebanon
Expatriate footballers in Lebanon
Togolese expatriate sportspeople in the Maldives
Expatriate footballers in the Maldives
Togo A' international footballers
2020 African Nations Championship players
AS Togo-Port players
ASKO Kara players
Dynamic Togolais players
OC Agaza players
AS Douanes (Togo) players